The 2018–19 season was AaB's 36th consecutive season in the top flight of Danish football, 29th consecutive season in the Danish Superliga, and 133rd year in existence as a football club.

Club

Coaching staff 

{| class="wikitable"
!Position
!Staff
|-
|Head coach|| Morten Wieghorst (sacked on 26 November 2018) Jacob Friis (from 26 November 2018)
|-
|Assistant coaches|| Jacob Friis (until 26 November 2018) Thomas Augustinussen (until 31 December 2018) Allan K. Jepsen (from 1 January 2019) Lasse Stensgaard (from 1 January 2019)
|-
|Development manager|| Poul Erik Andreasen
|-
|Goalkeeping coach|| Poul Buus
|-
|Analyst|| Jim Holm Larsen
|-
|Team Leader|| Ernst Damborg
|-
|Doctor|| Søren Kaalund
|-
|Physiotherapist|| Morten Skjoldager
|-
|Physical trainer|| Ashley Tootle
|-
|U/19 League coach|| Lasse Stensgaard (until 31 December 2018) David Olsen (from 1 January 2019)
|-
|U/17 League coach|| David Olsen (until 31 December 2018) Nikolaj Hørby (from 1 January 2019)
|-

Other information 

|-

Squad

First team squad 

This squad list includes any first team squad player who was available for the line-up during the season.

Source: AaB Fodbold website

Youth players in use 

This list includes any youth player from AaB Academy who was used in the season.

Transfers and loans

In

Summer

Winter

Out

Summer

Winter

Loan in

Loan out

Friendlies

Pre-season

Mid-season

Competitions

Competition record

Superliga

Results summary

Regular season

Matches

Relegation round 
Points and goals will carry over in full from the regular season.

Matches

European play-offs

Quarter-finals

Sydbank Pokalen

Statistics

Appearances 

This includes all competitive matches. The list is sorted by shirt number when appearances are equal.

Goalscorers 

This includes all competitive matches. The list is sorted by shirt number when total goals are equal.

Assists 

This includes all competitive matches. The list is sorted by shirt number when total assists are equal.

Clean sheets 

This includes all competitive matches. The list is sorted by shirt number when total clean sheets are equal.

Disciplinary record 

This includes all competitive matches. The list is sorted by shirt number when total cards are equal.

Notes
Note 1: Jores Okore was sent off against AGF on 21 October 2018. However, the referee and the Superliga Disciplinary Board later withdrew the red card, leaving Okore not being suspended for the upcoming matches. In this statistic, though, the red is still counted in.

Suspensions 

This includes all competitive matches. The list is sorted by shirt number when total matches suspended are equal.

Awards

Team

Individual

References 

2018-19
Danish football clubs 2018–19 season